Neil Thomas Richardson (born 3 March 1968) is an English former footballer who played as a centre back.

Playing career
Richardson joined Rotherham United from Brandon United in August 1989. He had a loan at Exeter City in 1996. Whilst at Rotherham he was a part of the team that won the 1996 Football League Trophy Final. After making 226 appearances and scoring 12 goals for Rotherham, he joined Mansfield Town in August 1999. He retired from playing after making 35 appearances for the club.

Coaching career
After being a coach at Mansfield Town, he became the Boston United head of youth football in April 2005. He worked as caretaker youth coach at York City in 2006 after Ian Kerr was suffering from illness,

References

1968 births
Living people
Footballers from Sunderland
English footballers
Association football central defenders
Brandon United F.C. players
Rotherham United F.C. players
Exeter City F.C. players
Mansfield Town F.C. players
English Football League players
York City F.C. non-playing staff